Baraebong is a mountain of Jeollabuk-do, western South Korea. It has an elevation of 1,165 metres.

See also
List of mountains of Korea

References

One-thousanders of South Korea
Mountains of South Korea
Mountains of North Jeolla Province